Live from London is a live concert video by the British rock band Steve Harley & Cockney Rebel, filmed during a concert in 1984. It was the band's first release on VHS, being released in 1985.

Background
After a Christmas tour in 1981, Steve Harley & Cockney Rebel would not embark on another tour again until 1989. However, the band did perform three odd shows during 1983 and 1984, including the Reading Festival in 1983 and the Camden Palace in London on 14 December 1984. The London show was the last the band would perform until 1989, and was the debut performance for band's new violinist/guitarist Barry Wickens.

The Camden Palace concert was recorded for a one-hour TV special broadcast, and then released on VHS the following year. Filmed by Trilion Pictures Ltd., the VHS was released via Castle Communications Plc. It was directed by Marc Over and produced by Philip Goodhand-Tait. The footage features fifteen tracks, discounting the 'Live from London' title music, which was counted as a separate track on the VHS track-listing.

Trilion Pictures Ltd would film two other Camden Palace concerts during 1984 for the British heavy metal band Girlschool and Canadian heavy metal band Thor. Castle Communications Plc. would also release these two concerts on VHS, as Play Dirty Live (Girlschool) and Live in London (Thor), similar to that of the Steve Harley & Cockney Rebel release.

Release
Live from London was released on VHS through Castle Communications Plc in 1985. Despite the back cover listing 16 tracks in total, the last two "Sweet Dreams" and "(I Believe) Love's a Prima Donna" did not actually appear on the release, but were performed during the concert and were included in the TV broadcast. In 2001, the concert was given its first DVD release through CP Entertainment as part of their 'Legends of Rock' series. The footage was digitally remastered for the DVD. CP Entertainment released two different editions of the DVD, one of which was a 'Collectors Edition' and featured different artwork, though both editions shared the same catalogue number. The Collectors Edition DVD had the bonus feature of being a DVD Plus flip-disc, meaning that an audio CD version of the concert was placed on the other side of the DVD disc.

On 26 February 2007, Live from London was given a new DVD release through Rhino. Another DVD release followed on 11 June 2012, when it was released by the Store for Music. This version of the concert came with a bonus feature of a previously unseen photo gallery, featuring photographs taken from the same concert. On 24 March 2017, the Store for Music released the concert on CD and as an audio download.

Track listing

VHS track listing
 "Live from London - Title Music" (Spaniel Music)
 "Here Comes the Sun" (George Harrison)
 "I Can't Even Touch You" (Steve Harley)
 "Freedom's Prisoner" (Harley)
 "Judy Teen" (Harley)
 "I Just Wanna Be a Star" (Harley)
 "Irresistible" (Harley)
 "Sebastian" (Harley)
 "Riding the Waves" (Harley)
 "Promises" (Harley)
 "Mr Soft" (Harley)
 "Sling It!" (Harley)
 "Make Me Smile" (Harley)
 "Tumbling Down" (Harley)
 "Sweet Dreams" (Harley) 
 "Psychomodo"(Harley)
 "(I Believe) Love's a Prima Donna" (Harley)

Though listed on the VHS, "Sweet Dreams" and "(I Believe) Love's a Prima Donna" were not included in the footage. However, when the footage aired in Europe as a television special, "Sweet Dreams"/"Psychomodo" and "(I Believe) Love's a Prima Donna" were included. Footage of these 3 songs has since surfaced on YouTube.

DVD track listing
 "Here Comes the Sun"
 "I Can't Even Touch You"
 "Freedom's Prisoner"
 "Judy Teen"
 "I Just Wanna Be a Star"
 "Irresistible"
 "Sebastian"
 "Riding the Waves"
 "Promises"
 "Mr Soft"
 "Sling It!"
 "Make Me Smile"
 "Tumbling Down"

Critical reception

Of the 2001 DVD release of Live from London, Mike Sutton of the website The Digital Fix commented: "Considering that Steve Harley wrote one of the defining songs of the seventies - the sublime "(Come Up And See Me) Make Me Smile" - it's fair to say that I had fairly positive expectations of this concert DVD. While these weren't totally dashed, I have to admit that I wasn't particularly impressed. The music isn't bad at all but the presentation of the DVD is disappointing. The songs are generally of a pretty high standard, although these live versions aren't a patch on the original records. The quality of the picture is mediocre at best. Although this release is superior to some of the others released by CP, it's certainly not an essential purchase. Even fans of Steve Harley are likely to be a little disappointed by the poor visual quality of the concert."

Personnel

Cockney Rebel
 Steve Harley - lead vocals, guitar
 Rick Driscoll - lead guitar
 Alan Darby - lead guitar
 Barry Wickens - violin
 Ian Keller (née Nice - Harley's brother) - keyboards
 Kevin Powell - bass guitar
 Lindsay Elliott - drums
 Martin Jay - backing vocals
 Suzanne Murphy - backing vocals

N.B. 1 - although this video and 1989's 'Come Back, All Is Forgiven Tour' programme credits Ian Keller, Keller changed his name back to Ian Nice when the by the time that the DVD from the 1989 tour was released.
N.B. 2 - Alan Darby would return to the band in 1992, replacing Robbie Gladwell, who played in 1990 and 1991. Gladwell would return to the band in 1999, and, as of 2022, he continues to play lead guitar in the band.

Concert crew
 Roy Wood - sound engineer
 Mick Gibbs - sound recording
 Steve Harley - sound mix
 Steve Hills - sound mix
 Scott Thompson - monitor engineer
 Dave Thomas - backline technician
 Clive Davies - lighting designer
 Leanne Bogen - graphics

Video production team
 Marc Over - director
 Philip Goodhand-Tait - producer
 Trilion Pictures Ltd. - studio
 Castle Communications Plc. - label

References

Live video albums
1985 video albums